Blow Horn is an album by FJF (Free Jazz Four), a quartet formed by Swedish saxophonist Mats Gustafsson and American reedist Ken Vandermark with the Chicago's NRG Ensemble rhythm section of bassist Kent Kessler and drummer Steve Hunt. It was recorded in 1995 and released on Okka Disk.

Reception

In his review for AllMusic, Tim Sheridan states: "This is improvised music with little form, but plenty of invention."

Track listing
All compositions by Gustafsson/Hunt/Kessler/Vandermark except as indicated
 "Dedication"  – 13:36
 "Blow Horn for Service" – 12:12
 "Biomass" – 6:06
 "Structure a la Malle (1st Version)" (Gustafsson) – 14:31
 "Carry Out" – 4:56

Personnel
Mats Gustafsson – tenor saxophone, baritone saxophone, French flageolet
Kent Kessler – bass
Steve Hunt – drums
Ken Vandermark – tenor saxophone, bass clarinet

References

1997 albums
Mats Gustafsson albums
Ken Vandermark albums
Okka Disk albums